John Lord (2 April 1937 – 30 July 2021) was an Australian rules footballer who played with Melbourne in the Victorian Football League (VFL). Although he played his early football in Echuca he was recruited from the Lismore Football Club on the Western Plains of Victoria where he was stationed with Elders Smith, now Elders Limited.

A strong mark, Lord was used by coach Norm Smith in both defence and attack. He played most of his early football down back and was a Melbourne premiership player in 1957, 1959 and 1960. In the 1964 VFL Grand Final he kicked two goals from the forward pocket to help his side to victory over Collingwood and earn his fourth premiership.

References

External links

1937 births
2021 deaths
Australian rules footballers from Victoria (Australia)
Melbourne Football Club players
Echuca Football Club players
Four-time VFL/AFL Premiership players
Melbourne Football Club Premiership players